RMO may refer to:

 Racemethorphan
 Rahul Mohindar oscillator
 Regional Mathematical Olympiad
 Regimental Medical Officer
 Resident Medical Officer
Rijksmuseum van Oudheden
 RMO (cycling team)
 RMO (Norwegian resistance)
 Rocky Mountain oysters